The I. B. Perrine Bridge is a four-lane truss arch span in the western United States. Located at Twin Falls, Idaho, it carries U.S. Highway 93 over the Snake River Canyon, connecting to Jerome County and Interstate 84.

The bridge is named for I. B. Perrine (1861–1943), who spearheaded the early 20th century irrigation projects in the Magic Valley region and is largely credited as the main founder of Twin Falls; a statue of Perrine is at the visitors' center at the south end of the bridge.

History

Originally named the Twin Falls-Jerome Intercounty Bridge, a steel cantilever bridge was opened to traffic  in September 1927, and formally dedicated by governor H. C. Baldridge on October 1, 1927. The privately financed $750,000 structure (equivalent to $ million in  dollars) was originally a toll bridge; the tolls were eliminated in April 1940 after the bridge was purchased by the state of Idaho for $482,000 (equivalent to $ million in  dollars).

By the early 1970s, the original bridge was outdated and unable to handle heavy loads and required replacement. Construction of the current bridge began in May 1973 and was completed in July 1976 at a cost of $10.56 million (equivalent to $ million in  dollars). The new bridge was dedicated on July 31, 1976; the original cantilever bridge to the west was later disassembled.

Tourism
Located at the southwest end of the Perrine Bridge is the Twin Falls Visitor Center featuring souvenirs and gifts, Idaho products, visitor information, and interactive exhibits highlighting the recreational and historical activities and attractions in the region. The visitor center has views of the canyon, bridge, and access to the trail system along the canyon rim. Trails go under the bridge on either side which offers vantage points of the bridge and its structure.

To the east, along the south rim of the canyon, lies the dirt ramp used by Evel Knievel when he unsuccessfully attempted his Snake River Canyon jump on the Skycycle X-2 in September 1974; the jump failed because of a parachute malfunction. A memorial to Knievel is located near the bridge; it was dedicated in September 1985, at a small ceremony attended by Knievel.

BASE jumping
The Perrine Bridge is a popular BASE jumping site known all over the world; it may be the only man-made structure in the United States where BASE jumping is allowed year-round without a permit. Jumpers often use the nearby visitor center as a home base before and after parachuting from the bridge.

The first documented and video-recorded/photographed jumps from the bridge were in 1987, by three residents of Twin Falls (former U.S. Army paratroopers) who static line jumped the bridge using military surplus MC1-1B parachutes. It was done after a test drop of a 55-gallon (210 liter) drum in a T-10 parachute harness and canopy was used. Multiple successful jumps were conducted without incident or injury. In the early 1990s, bungee jumping and parachuting off the bridge gained popularity, but was still against the law; by the end of the decade, BASE jumping was legal. In July 2006, Dan Schilling jumped off the bridge 201 times in 21 hours to raise money for charity; Schilling was hoisted to the top of the bridge by a crane after every jump.
Three base jumpers have to date perished jumping from the Perrine Bridge; Brandon John Chance, James E Hickey, and Kristin Renee Czyz.

Gallery

See also

List of bridges documented by the Historic American Engineering Record in Idaho
List of bridges in the United States by height
List of crossings of the Snake River

References

External links

VisitIdaho.org – Perrine Bridge

Highest Bridges – Perrine Bridge
Bridgehunter – Perrine Bridge
Idaho Transportation Dept. - webcam - U.S. 93 - Perrine Bridge
Twin Falls Visitor Center
 of previous bridge

Bridges completed in 1974
Open-spandrel deck arch bridges in the United States
Road bridges in Idaho
Twin Falls, Idaho
Buildings and structures in Twin Falls County, Idaho
Transportation in Twin Falls County, Idaho
Tourist attractions in Twin Falls County, Idaho
U.S. Route 93
Bridges of the United States Numbered Highway System
Bridges over the Snake River
Former toll bridges in Idaho
Historic American Engineering Record in Idaho
Steel bridges in the United States
Truss bridges in the United States